Kanwer Singh (born July 12, 1981), known professionally as Humble the Poet, is a Canadian YouTube personality, author, rapper and spoken-word artist. He is the author of three books, Unlearn: 101 Simple Truths for a Better Life, Unlearn—Beneath the Surface: 101 Honest Truths to Take Life Deeper. and Things No One Else Can Teach Us.

Early life
Kanwer Singh was born and raised in Toronto, Ontario, Canada to immigrant Indian Punjabi Sikh parents. In 2010 he left his job as a teacher and became Humble the Poet to embrace poetry and spoken word full-time.

Career
Singh began releasing his recorded tracks on YouTube independently in 2008. He has toured internationally to promote his works. Singh has also collaborated with YouTube personality Lilly Singh and produced two music videos titled #LEH and #IVIVI respectively. Humble the Poet won the 2017 Canada Reads book contest, championing the book Fifteen Dogs written by Andre Alexis. In April 2020, Singh appeared on A Little Late with Lilly Singh with Jay Shetty, and again by himself in May 2021. He also revealed that he would begin a podcast, titled "Humble The Poet Daily'ish"

Bibliography
 Unlearn: 101 Simple Truths for a Better Life (April, 2019)
 Things No One Else Can Teach Us (October, 2019)

Awards and nominations

See also 

 South Asian Canadians in the Greater Toronto Area

References

External links

 Humble The Poet's Website
 

1981 births
Living people
Canadian songwriters
Canadian YouTubers
Canadian Sikhs
Musicians from Toronto
Video bloggers
Writers from Toronto
Canadian people of Indian descent
Canadian people of Punjabi descent
Male bloggers
21st-century Canadian male singers